European Team Championships is the name of the team sports competition between European countries organized by various European sports federations. May refer to:

 European Athletics Team Championships, former European Team Championships (ETC), athletics team competition between different countries of Europe
 European Mixed Team Badminton Championships, badminton team competition between different countries of Europe
 European Bowls Team Championships, bowls team competition between different countries of Europe
 European Team Championships (bridge), bridge team competition between different countries of Europe
 European Team Chess Championship, chess team competition between different countries of Europe
 European Combined Events Team Championships, combined events team competition between different countries of Europe
 European Golf Team Championships, golf team competition between different countries of Europe
 European Race Walking Team Championships, race walking team competition between different countries of Europe
 European Squash Team Championships, squash team competition between different countries of Europe